Willi Willi Caves Nature Reserve covers 8 ha and is located on the Mid North Coast of New South Wales on the lower slope of a ridge in  the upper Macleay River catchment, 35 km to the west of Kempsey. 

Willi Willi Caves Nature Reserve protects part of a limestone karst system.

The Australian Speleological Federation (ASF  1985) lists some 37 entrances in the reserve with the Willi Willi Bat Cave being the main feature.  This cave is basically one large chamber with a number of branching tunnels connected to it and is used as a maternity cave by the common bent-wing bat.

See also

List of caves in Australia

Notes

Mid North Coast
Protected areas of New South Wales
Caves of New South Wales